Diosgenin, a phytosteroid sapogenin, is the product of hydrolysis by acids, strong bases, or enzymes  of saponins, extracted from the  tubers of Dioscorea wild yam species, such as the Kokoro. The sugar-free (aglycone) product of such hydrolysis, diosgenin is used for the commercial synthesis of cortisone, pregnenolone, progesterone, and other steroid products.

Sources
It is present in detectable amounts in Costus speciosus, Smilax menispermoidea, Helicteres isora, species of Paris, Aletris, Trigonella, and Trillium, and in extractable amounts from many species of Dioscorea – D. althaeoides, D. colletti, D. composita, D. floribunda, D. futschauensis, D. gracillima, D. hispida, D. hypoglauca, D. mexicana, D. nipponica, D. panthaica, D. parviflora, D. septemloba, and D. zingiberensis.

Industrial uses 
Diosgenin is a precursor for several hormones, starting with the Marker degradation process, which includes synthesis of progesterone. The process was used in the early manufacturing of combined oral contraceptive pills.

References

External links
 

Estrogens
Hormonal contraception
Progestogens
Spiro compounds
Steroids
Tetrahydrofurans
Tetrahydropyrans